Simon Lack (19 December 19138 August 1980) was a Scottish actor.

He was born Alexander MacAlpine, in Cleland, North Lanarkshire, Scotland. Known locally as Alec, he was the youngest child and only son of his father, Alexander McAlpine (known as Sandy) and his mother, Euphemia Ritchie.  His sisters were Charlotte (Lottie), Mary, Euphemia (Euphie), Agnes (Nan), and Jenny.  Another sister, Jessie, died in childhood.  Sandy McAlpine was a stonemason but worked down the mines when there was no masonry work available, making Simon Lack's later role in Proud Valley particularly poignant to those who knew him from his youth. Euphemia Ritchie's family were somewhat wealthier, but she was disowned on account of her choice of husband, and the family lived for many years in a one-room flat (known in Scottish working class language as a 'single end'), although it seems eventually one of her uncles relented and came to their aid. Alec's earliest ventures into acting were in local theatres.

He seems to have chosen the pseudonym Simon Lack when he embarked upon the London stage.

He lost five years during the Second World War (as did so many British actors). He served in the European theatre and was present at Monte Cassino.

After the war he returned to acting, getting back into stage work.

He was also a member of the BBC Radio company during the late 1950s/early 1960s, and notably guest-starred in all but two of the Paul Temple serials (mysteries) that starred Peter Coke and Marjorie Westbury.

His television roles included two Doctor Who serials; The Mind of Evil (1971) and The Androids of Tara (1978). He also guest-starred in episodes of The Saint, Jason King, and Doomwatch. He had co-starring roles in Telford's Change, Enemy at the Door and The Borgias.

Filmography

References

External links

 The Simon Lack Affair

1913 births
1980 deaths
People from Cleland, North Lanarkshire
Scottish male film actors
Scottish male television actors
20th-century Scottish male actors
British military personnel of World War II